"Hope" is a song by American DJ and production duo The Chainsmokers. Released on December 14, 2018, via Disruptor Records and Columbia Records, it features Swedish singer Winona Oak.

Background
Dancing Astronaut described the song as having "rhythm and light synth patterns that create a tropical house feel, adding a soothing background for its verses of combined vocal contributions." "Hope" was released as the final single from the Chainsmokers' second studio album Sick Boy. The song was described as being about "the desire of someone to be loved".

Music video
The lyric video of the song was released on December 14, 2018. It features the Chainsmokers and Winona Oak "laying on the floor covered in colorful flashing lights". Oak, being "the main focus of the video", appears wearing a "tan trench coat and red flannel shirt".

Personnel 
Adapted from the album liner notes, Spotify, and Tidal 
Andrew Taggart – songwriting, vocals
Alex Pall – songwriting, production
Chris Lyon – songwriting, production
Kate Morgan – songwriting
Michelle Mancini – mastering
Jordan Stilwell – mixing, recording
Winona Oak – vocals, songwriting

Charts

Weekly charts

Year-end charts

Certifications

References

Indie pop songs
The Chainsmokers songs
Winona Oak songs
2018 singles
Songs written by Andrew Taggart
Songs written by Alex Pall